Dove Schools is a college-preparatory charter school district in Oklahoma. It was founded and organized in 2000 by Sky Foundation, Inc. as a single middle school serving 218 students in grades 6–8. As of 2022, it serves just under 3000 students in grades K-12 at a total of 8 schools.

Curriculum
Dove Science Academy schools provide accelerated programs of learning, with students often having received the required number of high school credits for reception of a high school diploma by the 11th grade although they stay until the 12th grade to complete college level courses. Dove Science Academy schools have a stronger focus on the education of mathematics and science than on other subjects. However, a variety of subjects are taught at the schools due to the flexibility of the charter school system, which allows the Dove Science Academy schools to adapt curricula based on the needs of their students.

Each Dove Science Academy school opens only with acceptance of students into a middle school, from the 6th grade to the 8th grade, and a grade is added each year.

Participation in competition
Dove Science Academy school students participate in competitions because of the school's emphasis on extracurricular activity. Competitions in which Dove Science Academy schools are especially active include MathCounts, Science Olympiad, FIRST Lego League, FIRST Tech Challenge, FIRST Robotics Competition, and Science Fair.

References

External links
 DSA GreatSchools Profile

Schools in Tulsa, Oklahoma
Public high schools in Oklahoma
Public middle schools in Oklahoma
Charter schools in Oklahoma